Lo zio d'America is an Italian television series.

Cast

Christian De Sica: Massimo Ricciardi
Ornella Muti: Maria Monticelli
Lorella Cuccarini: Francesca
Eleonora Giorgi: Beatrice Ricciardi
Rosanna Banfi: Mercedes Ricciardi
Karin Proia: Manuela De Crescenzo
Paolo Conticini: Vanni Ceccarello
Giulia Steigerwalt: Flaminia De Crescenzo
Leila Durante: Nené
Erika Blanc: Giovanna Ricciardi
Pino Insegno: Alfonso
Enio Drovandi: Ignazio il portiere
Roberto Alpi: Federico
Edoardo Leo: Fabio
Sofia Milos: Barbara Steele
Myriam Catania: Claudia
Mario Maranzana: Svjatoslav
Monica Scattini: Polissena Vanvitelli
Stefania Barca: Simona Cavalieri
Enzo De Caro: Lorenzo Vanvitelli
Mattia Sbragia: Andrea
Stefano Benassi: Carlo Gabrieli
Ray Lovelock: Gianluigi Patrizi
Pino Ammendola: Jean Pierre
Pino Quartullo: Domenico

See also
List of Italian television series

External links
 

Italian television series
RAI original programming